Zuda Comics was DC Comics' webcomics imprint from 2007 until 2010. Some of the imprints series won awards and nominations from comic industry's Glyph Comics Awards and Harvey Awards. Bayou, Volume 1 was also named one of the 2010 Great Graphic Novels for Teens by the American Library Association.

History
The site was announced via press release on July 9, 2007, the imprint was launched to publish new material featuring new characters online. The site's content was chosen by the users through monthly competitions, as "the majority of the web comics will be selected by Zudacomics.com's visitors, who will vote on new web comics presented to them in periodic competitions". The first commissioned ongoing strips and material competing for the public vote were published on October 30, 2007. Zuda removed the competition aspect in April 2010 and in July, soon after the launch of DC's digital comics service, Zuda was closed and folded into the new digital publishing arm.

Competition mechanics
Comic creators were invited to submit their own eight-page comics, and each month ten were selected to compete by editorial. Users could vote for their favorite and the winner received a contract to continue their comic on Zuda. When the contract was filled, if the comic was liked enough it could be renewed for an additional "season". Occasionally an "instant winner" was chosen to receive a contract without having to compete. In July 2008, an "invitational" was held in which losing comics were invited back to compete.

Staff
The Zuda staff consisted of:
Paul Levitz – Publisher
Richard Bruning – SVP-Creative Director
Ronald Perazza – VP of Creative Services
Kwanza Johnson – DC Comics Online Editor
Nika Vagner – DC Comics Online Assistant Editor
Jessica Numsuwankijkul – DC Comics Assistant Editor
Dave McCullough – DC Comics Online Technology Manager

Titles
Instant winners
 Bayou by Jeremy Love
 The Night Owls by Peter Timony and Bobby Timony
 Street-Code by Dean Haspiel
 The Imaginary Boys by Carlos López Bermúdez
 I Rule The Night by Kevin Colden
 Bottle of Awesome by Andy Belanger and Ian Herring
 La Morté Sisters by Tony Trov, Johnny Zito & Christine Larsen

Competition winners
 High Moon (November 2007 – 2010)
 Pray for Death (December 2007)
 Supertron (January 2008 – 2010)
 Road (February 2008 – 2010)
 The Black Cherry Bombshells (March 2008 – 2010)
 Melody (April 2008)
 Celadore (May 2008)
 Dual (June 2008 – 2010)
 Re-Evolution (July 2008)
 Gulch (August 2008)
 Blood Hunter (September 2008 – 2010)
 Azure (October 2008 – 2010)
 Extracurricular Activities (November 2008)
 Devil's Wake (December 2008 – 2010)
 Safe Inside (January 2009 – 2010)
 The Hammer (February 2009)
 Deadly (March 2009 – 2010)
 Earthbuilders (April 2009 – 2010)
 Lily of the Valley (May 2009 – 2010)
 Sidewise (June 2009 – 2010)
 RockStar (July 2009 – 2010)
 Absolute Magnitude (August 2009 – 2010)
 Goldilock (September 2009 –2010)
 Eldritch (April 2010)

Print editions
 Bayou by Jeremy Love, June 2009
 High Moon, September 2009
 The Night Owls, March 2010
 Celadore, October 2010

Reception
The initial announced line-up of talent included no prominent webcomics creators, prompting Todd Allen at Comic Book Resources to opine: "[T]he vast majority of the initial creators here have already done print comics. Multiple print comics for the most part, and the majority go back a few years. ... This does not look like ushering in a new generation". He conceded, however, "that they've lined up some strips with professional pedigree for the first batch".

Notes

External links

Interview: DC's Web Comics Imprint, IGN
The Opening Team: Talking to the First Wave of Zuda Creators, Newsarama, November 1, 2007
Comic, webcomic pros respond to Zuda, Newsarama, July 11, 2007

DC Comics imprints
Webcomic publishing companies
Publishing companies established in 2007
Publishing companies disestablished in 2010
2007 establishments in the United States
2007 in comics